Vernon Hamilton (born December 28, 1984) is an American retired professional basketball player who currently works in player development for the Dallas Mavericks. He played college basketball at Clemson University where he also obtained his undergraduate and master's degrees.  When Hamilton isn't playing professional basketball he spends much of his time in the community working with 100 Black Men of America in Atlanta, Georgia.

High school career
Hamilton was ranked the number 83 high school prospect in the country his senior season. Hamilton averaged 24 points as a senior, along with averages of 7.7 assists, 6.2 rebounds, and 3 steals per game and lead Benedictine High School to its first ever state Private school title. Hamilton was also all-state and all-conference as a defensive back and wide receiver, and received several offers to play college football.

College career
After graduating from high school Vernon Hamilton signed with the Clemson Tigers.  Hamilton was a 4-year starting during his tenure with Clemson.  Hamilton was an honorable mention selection for the AP All-ACC Freshman team in 2004. Hamilton was on the All-ACC Defensive team in 2006 and 2007. Hamilton was the first Clemson player since 1998 to be invited to play in the 2007 NABC All Star Game. Hamilton finished his career at Clemson as the record holder for most steals in a season (83), highest average steals per game in a season (2.68), and the Clemson career steals record (271).

College statistics

Professional career

NBA and NBA D-League
On September 29, 2008 Hamilton signed a contract with the Cleveland Cavaliers and played in several pre-season games earning high praise from coach Mike Brown.  Brown was quoted as saying "I thought Vern Hamilton had a terrific game for us."

On September 28, 2010  Hamilton signed a contract with the Detroit Pistons.  He went on to play in 5 preseason games for the Pistons.

Hamilton also had workouts with both the Dallas Mavericks and Washington Wizards.

International
In 2013 Hamilton played 17 games for ENAD of the Cyprus Basketball Division 1 and averaged 8.5 points, 5 rebounds, 1.8 assists, and 2.3 steals per game.

In 2010–2011 Hamilton went to play for the Tianjin Ronggang Golden Lions in the Chinese Basketball Association where he averaged 26.8 points 8.5 rebounds 4.9 assists, and 5.0 steals per game.

Coaching
Hamilton is now a Graduate Assistant coach under Brad Brownell at Clemson.

References

External links

 DraftExpress.com Profile

1984 births
Living people
African-American basketball players
American expatriate basketball people in China
American expatriate basketball people in Cyprus
American expatriate basketball people in Latvia
American expatriate basketball people in Lebanon
American expatriate basketball people in New Zealand
American expatriate basketball people in Switzerland
American expatriate basketball people in Turkey
American expatriate basketball people in Ukraine
American men's basketball players
Austin Toros players
Basketball players from Richmond, Virginia
BK Liepājas Lauvas players
Clemson Tigers men's basketball players
Colorado 14ers players
Dakota Wizards players
Darüşşafaka Basketbol players
Fort Wayne Mad Ants players
Iowa Energy players
MBC Mykolaiv players
Point guards
SAM Basket players
Tianjin Pioneers players
Waikato Pistons players
21st-century African-American sportspeople
20th-century African-American people